The Landwind X6 is a mid-size SUV produced by Jiangling Motor Holding, a joint venture between Changan Auto and Jiangling Motors Corporation Group (JMCG).

Overview
The Landwind X6 was originally the JMC Landwind, and the name changed to Landwind X6 when Landwind became an individual brand under JMC.
Like some Chinese-made cars, the JMC Landwind is largely derived from older imported technology and design, in this case the Isuzu Rodeo, which was sold from 1998 to 2004. There are two SUVs built on the platform, including the 5-door Landwind X6 and the 3-door Landwind X9. The 3-door Landwind X9 was discontinued in 2016.

Engines
The European market Landwinds are available with two Mitsubishi-built gasoline-powered engines and one Isuzu-built diesel engine.

2.0 L - 115 hp (84 kW)
2.4 L - 125 hp (92 kW)
2.8 L diesel - 92 hp (68 kW)

The JMC Baodian uses the JX493ZLQ4F engine and the maximum output is 109 hp and the maximum torque is 245 N•m. The only transmission is a five-speed manual gearbox.

2006 Paris Motor Show
At the 2006 Paris Motor Show, Landwind displayed an updated version of its SUV, called X-Pedition, as well as an MPV called the Fashion (Landwind CV9) that would compete in the same size class with MPVs such as the Kia Carens.

JMC variants
In China a long wheelbase variant of the SUV is also sold under the name of JMC or Jiangling Baowei and it is also available as a pickup truck called the Jiangling Baodian.

Oversea markets
The Baodian is exported as the "JMC Boarding" to Asian, South American, and African markets (amongst others).

Controversy

The Landwind has attracted a controversy after a series of safety tests. The car made headlines after German car club ADAC showed in its crash test, carried out for Euro NCAP, that a driver of this vehicle would not survive a head-on collision at 64 km/h (40 MPH).

The Dutch importer of the Landwind called for a test by German safety monitoring agency TÜV to show that the car was in fact safe enough for European standards. These tests are similar to the Euro NCAP tests, but the collision speed is lower at 54 km/h (35 mph). Despite the worst crash results in decades TÜV subsequently confirmed that the Landwind met all mandatory safety criteria according to ECE R94.

The controversy did not end there. Opponents say the TÜV test is not enough to guarantee vehicle safety today. They claim that R94 is outdated and only guarantees that the driver will be alive after a crash, and that it does not take into account serious injuries such as severe crushing of the legs. R94 is also performed at a lower speed.

Ron Zwaans, general director of Landwind Europe, says his company is working together with ADAC to keep improving the Landwind's safety. He claims his goal is to ultimately pass the more rigorous Euro NCAP testing.

References

External links

Landwind
Landwind 'X' range of SUVs
Official Jiangling website for Europe
Chinese 4x4 gets zero in safety test
Chinese Car Passes New Crash Test in Germany
View ADAC crash test
Jiangling Landwind X6 Crash Test - Passenger Cabin
Jiangling Landwind X6 Crash Test - Outside View
Jiangling Landwind X6 Crash Test by TUV
Jiangling Landwind X6 gets zero in crash test

Landwind vehicles
Cars of China
Mid-size sport utility vehicles
Automotive safety